Marco Holz (born 31 January 1990) is a German professional footballer who plays as a right-back for Regionalliga Bayern club Türkgücü München.

References

External links

1990 births
Living people
German footballers
German expatriate footballers
People from Deggendorf
Sportspeople from Lower Bavaria
Footballers from Bavaria
Association football fullbacks
SV Wacker Burghausen players
FC Energie Cottbus players
1. FC Saarbrücken players
Türkgücü München players
FC Wacker Innsbruck (2002) players
3. Liga players
Regionalliga players
2. Liga (Austria) players
Expatriate footballers in Austria
German expatriate sportspeople in Austria